"Bringing Up Baby" is the first episode of the fourth season of the American sitcom Modern Family, and the series' 73rd episode overall. It aired on September 26, 2012. The episode was written by Paul Corrigan & Brad Walsh and directed by Steven Levitan.

Ed O'Neill submitted this episode for consideration due to his nomination for the Primetime Emmy Award for Outstanding Supporting Actor in a Comedy Series at the 65th Primetime Emmy Awards.

Plot
It is Jay's (Ed O'Neill) 65th birthday and all he wants is a quiet day. However, Phil (Ty Burrell) has other things in mind. Along with Shorty (Chazz Palminteri) and Miles (Ernie Hudson), they decide to kidnap Jay and take him fishing. Jay, while blindfolded and with his hands tied, falls in the water and Phil punches him in the face to calm him down in an attempt to prevent him from drowning. Later, the men celebrate Jay's freedom from responsibility, now that he has reached an old age.

Cam (Eric Stonestreet) and Mitch (Jesse Tyler Ferguson) struggle after their attempts to adopt a second baby. They come to terms with the decision not to have a second child and propose to take a trip somewhere to deal with their disappointment, but Lily (Aubrey Anderson-Emmons) asks where her new baby brother is. Cam and Mitch tell her that she won't have a new baby brother and Lily responds that she wants a kitten instead. Even though Cam and Mitch are not thrilled with the idea, Cam changes his mind later and they go to an animal shelter. When the woman in charge tells them that they have to fill out paperwork to see if they are appropriate as cat guardians, Cam and Mitch become agitated due to its similarity to their failed adoption attempts and they leave.

Meanwhile, Gloria (Sofía Vergara) struggles with how to tell Jay that she is pregnant. She tells Manny (Rico Rodriguez) first to see his reaction and he tells her that Jay will not take it well, since he does not like changes. A conversation with Luke (Nolan Gould) about the new baby causes Manny to be concerned that Jay will not care about him as much anymore, and he becomes reluctant to leave for poetry camp for the summer.

At the Dunphy's house, Claire (Julie Bowen) is trying to deal with a hung-over Haley (Sarah Hyland) after her prom night and her request that Dylan (Reid Ewing) stay with them for a couple of weeks since he can not afford an apartment alone now that Haley is going to college. After Claire refuses, Dylan tries to make her feel guilty by telling her about his terrible alternate living arrangements, such as sleeping in his cousin's garage, in hopes that she changes her mind.

Gloria tells Claire, who is excited (mostly that Gloria will begin gaining pregnancy weight) and tells Gloria that Jay will be thrilled with the news, even though she knows that her dad will not react well, since Jay has a difficult time masking his responses. Concerned that Gloria will be hurt if Jay reacts badly, Claire warns Jay by telling him to react positively to the next big news he hears. Jay mistakes Cam and Mitchell's announcement that they plan to adopt a cat for the big news, and learns from a confused Manny that Gloria is pregnant. Gloria furiously announces that she will raise the baby with or without Jay's help, but is surprised when Jay tells her he is elated by the news. In truth, feeling that his freedom from responsibility signaled the end of his life, having the opportunity to raise a child all over again makes him very happy.

A few months later, the family is gathered at Jay and Gloria's house. Gloria's pregnancy is going well; Manny returns from the poetry camp and he reads a poem he wrote for his little baby brother or sister; Cam and Mitch have returned from London with a gift for the new baby and have adopted a cat named Larry, and Dylan has been staying with the Dunphy family (although the episode ends with Claire kicking him out).

Reception

Ratings
In its original American broadcast, "Bringing Up Baby" was watched by 14.44 million.

Reviews
The episode received positive reviews, with multiple reviewers waiting for more in the following episodes.

Donna Bowman of The A.V. Club gave an A− grade to the episode. "I love this. It’s a fantastic way to remind us that as standard-issue as we might peg Modern Family to be, it’s not going to let us characterize it as lazy."

Leigh Raines of TV Fanatic gave a 4.5/5 stating that watching the episode made her realize how much she had missed Dunphy/Pritchett clan. "However, the second he [Phil] giggled at Manny's lame joke and cracked that goofy grin, I realized how much I've missed the Dunphy/Pritchett clan these past few months. Between Manny's overly adult mannerisms and Haley and Claire's constant bickering, I loved catching up with everyone."

Michael Adams of 411mania rated the episode with 9/10. "I thought they started this season perfectly, especially since it was a "Jay Birthday episode" which has historically given us great moments. I will admit, I was very skeptical of them starting the episode back in May, but the transition from then to now was absolutely amazing. Kicking off a season is always hard, especially when the series is following a story arch throughout the entire season. We know that the baby is coming and a lot of things will be based on it, but the way they got us into it with tonights episode was fantastic."

Dalene Rovenstine from the Paste Magazine gave the episode 7/10.

References

External links 
 
 "Bringing Up Baby" at ABC.com

Modern Family (season 4) episodes
2012 American television episodes